Tom Woods (February 1, 1947) served as a member of the California State Assembly from 1994 until 1998. He chose not to run for a third term in 1998. He was succeeded by Richard "Dick" Dickerson.

References 

Living people
Republican Party members of the California State Assembly
1947 births
20th-century American politicians